The Party of Serbian Unity (abbr. ССЈ, SSJ) was a nationalist political party in Serbia, founded by Željko Ražnatović "Arkan".

It is today known as the Council of Serbian Unity, restored after seceding from the Serbian Radical Party.

The key goals of the party were:
Unity of the Serbian people
Preserving the integrity and territory of Serbia
Parliamentarism and Democracy
Preservation of tradition, family and the Cyrillic script.

Following the assassination of Željko Ražnatović Arkan in 2000, Borislav Pelević became president of the party. At the last legislative election in 2003, the SSJ was a part of the For National Unity alliance, which failed to receive any seats. The SSJ merged into the Serbian Radical Party in 2007.

In 2013, the party was re-founded as the Council of Serbian Unity by Pelević. The new party took part in the 2014 parliamentary election as part of the Patriotic Front coalition, but failed to reach the threshold.

Electoral results

References

External links
Council of Serbian Unity official website

Defunct political parties in Serbia
Political parties established in 1993
Conservative parties in Serbia
Eastern Orthodox political parties
Far-right politics in Serbia
Nationalist parties in Serbia
Serb nationalist parties
Right-wing parties in Europe